Michael Joseph McGrath (24 March 1882 – 28 February 1961) was an Irish-born prelate of the Roman Catholic Church. He served first as the bishop of Menevia from 1935 to 1940, then the archbishop of Cardiff from 1940 to 1961.

Personal history

Early life
McGrath was born in Kilkenny, Ireland on 24 March 1882. He was educated at a local Christian Brothers school before attending Rockwell College. He achieved a BA from the Royal University of Ireland in Irish language in 1915, and an MA from its successor the NUI in 1918. His university later awarded him an honorary D.Litt. in 1942.

Religious career
McGrath trained for the priesthood at St. John's College, Waterford, and he was ordained to the priesthood on 12 July 1908. He initially worked as a priest for the Catholic diocese of Clifton, followed by Bristol's Church of St. Nicholas. In 1918, he was forced take a leave of absence on health grounds. In 1921, he was invited by Bishop Francis Mostyn to work in the Diocese of Menevia. McGrath went on to serve at Flint, Bangor and, in 1928, Aberystywth as parish priest, where he befriended Thomas Gwynn Jones. On 10 August 1935 he was appointed the Bishop of the Diocese of Menevia in Swansea, south Wales. His consecration to the Episcopate took place on 24 September 1935, the principal consecrator was Archbishop Francis Mostyn of Cardiff, and the principal co-consecrators were Bishop William Lee of Clifton and Bishop Ambrose James Moriarty of Shrewsbury. Five years later, McGrath was translated to the Archdiocese of Cardiff as archbishop on 20 June 1940. He died in office on 28 February 1961, aged 78.

Report to Rome 
Archbishop McGrath sent a report to Rome on 7 March 1960, summarising his attitude to Wales. He wrote of the future of the Catholic community in Wales, noting that it made largely made up of descendants of Irish immigrants, separating it from the cultural life of Wales. McGrath also commented on the decline of the Welsh language since the First World War. McGrath predicted that this decline would undermine the religious life of the nation and lead to widespread religious indifference, leading to divorce, broken family life and abortion, among other things.

References

1882 births
1961 deaths
20th-century Roman Catholic bishops in Wales
People from Kilkenny (city)
Roman Catholic bishops of Menevia
Alumni of the Royal University of Ireland
Alumni of St John's College, Waterford
People educated at Rockwell College
Roman Catholic archbishops of Cardiff
Irish expatriate Catholic bishops